John Howard "Keith" Bridges (born 2 April 1952) is an English former professional rugby league footballer who played in the 1970s and 1980s. He played at representative level for Great Britain, England and Yorkshire, and at club level for Featherstone Rovers, Bradford Northern and Hull F.C., as an occasional goal-kicking , i.e. number 9, during the era of contested scrums.

Background
Bridges was born in Pontefract, West Riding of Yorkshire, England, and he was a pupil at Normanton Grammar School.

Club career

Featherstone Rovers
John "Keith" Bridges made his début for Featherstone Rovers on Wednesday 26 August 1970. 

Bridges played  in Featherstone Rovers' 33–14 victory over Bradford Northern in the 1973 Challenge Cup Final during the 1972–73 season at Wembley Stadium, London on Saturday 12 May 1973, in front of a crowd of 72,395, and played  in the 9–24 defeat by Warrington in the 1974 Challenge Cup Final during the 1973–74 season at Wembley Stadium, London on Saturday 11 May 1974, in front of a crowd of 77,400.

He played  in Featherstone Rovers' 0–4 defeat by Warrington in the Captain Morgan Trophy Final during the 1973–74 season at The Willows, Salford on Saturday 26 January 1974.

Bridges played  in Featherstone Rovers' 12–16 defeat by Leeds in the 1976 Yorkshire County Cup Final during the 1976–77 season at Headingley Rugby Stadium, Leeds on Saturday 16 October 1976, and played  in the 7–17 defeat by Castleford in the 1977 Yorkshire County Cup Final during the 1977–78 season, at Headingley Rugby Stadium, Leeds on Saturday 15 October 1977.

He played in Featherstone Rovers' victory in the Championship during the 1976–77 season, 

He played his last match for Featherstone Rovers during the 1978–79 Northern Rugby Football League season.

Bradford Northern
Bridges played  in Bradford Northern's 6–0 victory over Widnes in the 1979–80 John Player Trophy Final during the 1979–80 season at Headingley Rugby Stadium, Leeds on Saturday 5 January 1980.

Bridges played in Bradford Northern's victories in the Championship during the 1979–80 season and 1980–81 season.

Hull FC
Bridges played  in Hull FC's 18–7 victory over Bradford Northern in the 1982 Yorkshire County Cup Final during the 1982–83 season at Elland Road, Leeds on Saturday 2 October 1982.

Bridges played in Hull FC's victory in the Championship during the 1982–83 season, and also in their 12–14 defeat by Featherstone Rovers in the 1983 Challenge Cup Final at Wembley Stadium, London on Saturday 7 May 1983, in front of a crowd of 84,969.

Representative honours
John "Keith" Bridges won caps for England while at Featherstone Rovers in the 1975 Rugby League World Cup against New Zealand, Australia, Wales, France, New Zealand, Australia, and Australia, in 1975 against Papua New Guinea (non-test), in 1977 against Wales, and won caps for Great Britain while at Featherstone Rovers in 1974 against France (2 matches), and Australia.

He is one of only eight players who have ever scored a drop goal for England.

He won caps for Yorkshire while at Featherstone Rovers; during the 1975–76 season against Cumbria, Other Nationalities and Lancashire, and during the 1977–78 season against Cumbria, and Lancashire.

Honoured at Featherstone Rovers
John "Keith" Bridges is a Featherstone Rovers Hall of Fame inductee.

Personal life
Bridges is the son of Keith Bridges, who played rugby league for Wakefield Trinity and Castleford between 1954 and 1963. Although born as John Howard Bridges, he is nicknamed "Keith" after his father.

Outside of rugby league
John "Keith" Bridges was the Bar Manager of the Pinnacle Suite Function Room at Dewsbury District Golf Club, Mirfield until 2017.

References

External links
Legendary duo join Featherstone Rovers Hall of Fame
(archived by web.archive.org) Stats → PastPlayers → B at hullfc.com
(archived by web.archive.org) Statistics at hullfc.com
Photograph 'Bridges Out Cold - Northern hooker Bridges "completely out" during tonight's Odsal match. - 27 April 1979' at rlhp.co.uk
Photograph 'Ronnie Firth sprays the champagne - Chairman Ronnie Firth celebrates with the players in the Headingley dressing room after the win against Widnes. - 5 January 1980' at rlhp.co.uk (image upside-down)

1952 births
Living people
Bradford Bulls players
England national rugby league team players
English rugby league players
Featherstone Rovers players
Great Britain national rugby league team players
Hull F.C. players
Rugby league hookers
Rugby league players from Pontefract
Yorkshire rugby league team players